Asif Nagar is a major locality in the western part of Hyderabad, India. It is located north of the Musi River near Mehdipatnam. It is a mandal in the Hyderabad District and one of the oldest suburbs that have existed for a long while.

This used to be a legislative assembly seat but was delimited and now it comes under the Nampally seat. ACP Office for West Zone for Hyderabad Police is situated here.

Etymology 
The name "Asaf" is derived from the Asaf Jahi Dynasty the Nizam of Hyderabad. Nagar is the Urdu, Hindi and Dakahini word for town or colony.

Legislature 
In the Lok Sabha: Asif Nagar belongs to the Hyderabad Constituency with currently Asaduddin Owasi of the AIMIM party being the MP.

In the Telangana Legislative Assembly: Jaffer Hussain Meraj of the AIMIM party is the MLA of the Nampally Constituency. (This used to be a legislative assembly seat but was delimited.)

and in the GHMC Ghousia Sultana of AIMIM is the corporator (Asif Nagar Constituency)

Commercial Areas

Furniture 
Asif Nagar is famous for wood work and carving handiwork. The furniture prepared here is exported to across the globe. All types of Furniture will be there

Food 
Asif Nagar is known for its Naan bread. Famous naan shops like Madina Naan Centre have existed for more than half a century.

Schools 
The schools of this locality include:
 H.V.B.H.S
 Happy Scholar School (Nursery) 
 Ravindra Bharathi school
 Gowtam Model School 
 Narayana College IT Academy
 Sri Chaintanya Jr College
 G. Pulla Reddy College

Himalaya Book World also has a branch here (opposite to Azra Public School)

Entertainment 
This area is mostly residential but Talkies like Amba Theatre and Milan Cinema Hall are present for families to enjoy their free time.

Places of Worship

Qutub Shahi Masjid (Choti Masjid) 
Located at Arab Lane, Murad Nagar it is also called Choti Masjid. It holds the annual Eid prayer.

Transportation 
The closest MMTS station is 2 km away, at Nampally. Imliban Bus Stand and Jubilee Bus Stand are 4 and 9 km away respectively. The Secunderabad Railway Station is at a distance of 8 km, while the Rajiv Gandhi International Airport is 25 km away. Bring close to the center of Hyderabad, it is easy to travel around the city quickly from here.

Neighbourhoods

 Aghapura
 Bazar Ghat
 Dhool Pet
 Gosha Mahal
 Gudi Malkapur
 Humayun Nagar
 Jhirra
 JiyaGuda
 Karwan
 Mallepally
 Mangalhat
 Mehdipatnam
 Masab Tank
 Murad Nagar
 Nampally
 Seetaram Bagh
 Shantinagar
 Tallagadda
 Vijaya Nagar Colony

References

Neighbourhoods in Hyderabad, India